Axel Lerche (21 November 1903 – 3 October 1949) was a Danish sports shooter. He competed at the 1936 Summer Olympics and 1948 Summer Olympics.

References

External links
 

1903 births
1949 deaths
Danish male sport shooters
Olympic shooters of Denmark
Shooters at the 1936 Summer Olympics
Shooters at the 1948 Summer Olympics
People from Kalundborg
Sportspeople from Region Zealand